Lazar Radosavljević (born 9 April 1991) is a Serbian professional basketball player for Södertälje BBK of the Swedish Basketball League.

Professional career 
Radosavljević played for Crvena zvezda, Mornar, APOEL, Asseco Gdynia, Energia, Pieno žvaigždės, Södertälje Kings, AIK Basket, and Djurgårdens.

In June 2020, Radosavljević signed for Södertälje BBK.

National team career 
In July 2007, Radosavljević was a member of the Serbia U16 national team that won the gold medal at the FIBA Europe Under-16 Championship in Greece. Over eight tournament games, he averaged 10.5 points, six rebounds, and 1.2 assists per game. In July and August 2009, Radosavljević was a member of the Serbia U18 national team that won the gold medal at the FIBA Europe Under-18 Championship in France. Over nine tournament games, he averaged 8.6 points, six rebounds, and 1.3 assists per game. In July and August 2011, Radosavljević was a member of the Serbia U20 national team at the FIBA Europe Under-20 Championship in Bilbao, Spain. Over eight tournament games, he averaged four points and 1.4 rebounds per game.

Career achievements
 Cyprus Division A champion: 1  (with APOEL: 2013–14)
 Swedish Second League champion: 1  (with Djurgårdens: 2018–19)

References

External links

 Lazar Radosavljevic at eurobasket.com
 Lazar Radosavljevic at realgm.com
 Lazar Radosavljevic at proballers.com
 Lazar Radosavljevic at euroleague.net

1991 births
Living people
ABA League players
APOEL B.C. players
Asseco Gdynia players
Basketball League of Serbia players
BC Pieno žvaigždės players
CS Energia Rovinari players
KK Crvena zvezda players
KK Mornar Bar players
People from Leposavić
Power forwards (basketball)
Serbian expatriate basketball people in Cyprus
Serbian expatriate basketball people in Lithuania
Serbian expatriate basketball people in Montenegro
Serbian expatriate basketball people in Poland
Serbian expatriate basketball people in Romania
Serbian expatriate basketball people in Sweden
Serbian men's basketball players
Small forwards
Södertälje Kings players
Djurgårdens IF Basket players